Sar Asiab (also Romanized as Sar Āsīāb; also known as Garzābād va Kalāteh) is a village in Roshtkhar Rural District, in the Central District of Roshtkhar County, Razavi Khorasan Province, Iran. At the 2006 census, its population was 296, in 66 families.

References 

Populated places in Roshtkhar County